Kuckssee is a municipality in the Mecklenburgische Seenplatte district, in Mecklenburg-Vorpommern, Germany. It was formed on 1 January 2012 by the merger of the former municipalities Krukow, Lapitz and Puchow.

References